FYI is an abbreviation of "for your information".

FYI may also refer to:

Television
FYI (Canadian TV channel)
FYI (Southeast Asia TV channel)
FYI (American TV channel)
FYI (TV series), an American 1980s daily information program on the ABC network
FYI Daily, a British entertainment news television bulletin
FYI, a fictional television newsmagazine on the television show Murphy Brown
FYI, a weekend news programme for children on Sky News

Information technology 
 .fyi in list of Internet top-level domains
 A sub-series of Request for Comments

Other uses
"FYI", a song on Jay Electronica's 2007 mixtape Act I: Eternal Sunshine (The Pledge)
"FYI", a song on Miranda Cosgrove's 2009 EP About You Now
Film Your Issue, an American filmmaking competition
FYI, a human resources publication published by Buck